The Parecis titi monkey (Plecturocebus parecis) is a species of titi monkey, a type of New World monkey, endemic to Brazil.

Taxonomy 
This species was first discovered to Western science in 1914, where it was documented on the Parecis Plateau. Despite its clearly distinctive pelage, it was then identified as the ashy black titi (P. cinerascens) in a follow-up report. The species was rediscovered in the same region in 2011, where it was this time identified as a distinct, undescribed species. It was finally described as Plecturocebus parecis in 2019. The results of this study were followed by the IUCN Red List, ITIS, and American Society of Mammalogists. It is thought to be most closely related to P. cinerascens, with the clade containing both being the sister group to Milton's titi (P. miltoni).

It is known as otôhô in the local Paresi language.

Distribution 
This species is endemic to a small portion of Brazil, where its range is still poorly defined. Its range largely coincides with higher-elevation areas in the transition zone between the Amazon Rainforest and the Cerrado, including parts of the Parecis Plateau and the interfluves of the Aripuanã River with the Juruena and Roosevelt rivers. However, it is also known from relatively low-lying areas in Juruena National Park.

Description 
It can be distinguished from all other Plecturocebus species by its generally grayish-agouti pelage, along with a reddish-chestnut dorsum. Its throat, sideburns, breast, and inner limb surfaces are grayish-white in color, and its tail also turns white towards the tip.

Status 
The range of this species coincides with the "Arc of Deforestation", an agricultural frontier of the southern Amazon where the deforestation of the Amazon rainforest is the highest. The remaining tracts of native forest are impacted frequently by wildfires in the dry season, and further forest fragmentation has occurred due to the construction of hydroelectric dams, such as the UHE Rondon II. Increasing establishment of rural settlements due to land reform and squatting has led to further degradation and deforestation. Despite this, its habitat lies within some of the few protected areas in the region, and the steep sides of the Parecis Plateau make deforestation and development unappealing in the area. Due to this, it is classified as Near Threatened by the IUCN Red List.

References 

Plecturocebus
Mammals of Brazil
Endemic fauna of Brazil
Mammals described in 2019